Fear of the Digital Remix is the third studio album by industrial band Deitiphobia, released in January 1995 by Myx Records. All the songs on the album were created by Michael Knott using samples from two earlier Deitiphobia albums, Fear of God and Digital Priests - the Remixes, which he digitally edited to produce songs that barely resembled the originals they were taken from.

Track listing
All songs written by Michael Knott.

"TV" – 3:53
"Blind Hate" – 3:20
"Exorcist" – 4:38
"Need" – 4:08
"Religious Fanatic" – 4:52
"Mastermind" – 2:18
"Wilbur" – 4:21
"The Late Pastor Harry Dean" – 3:36
"Arc" – 3:50
"B-Movie" – 2:25
"Vamp Jesus" – 2:37

Personnel
Wally Shaw – vocals, keyboards, percussion, cover design
Brent Stackhouse – vocals, programming
Michael Knott – production
Brian Gardner – mastering
Bob Conlon – cover design
Thom Roy – art direction
Matthew Duffy – A&R

Deitiphobia albums
1995 remix albums